Garage Flower is an album by English rock band The Stone Roses.

The album was recorded in mid-1985 and was produced by Martin Hannett, collecting the band's early songs.
The album wasn't released at the time because the band were unhappy with the production and songs. Their self-titled album was the band's proper debut 4 years later.

The Garage Flower album was finally released in 1996 by Garage Flower Records.

The album contains previously unavailable early songs, and early versions of "I Wanna Be Adored" and "This Is the One". The album's title is taken from a lyric in "Tell Me".

Track listing
All songs written by Ian Brown, John Squire (misspelled in the album's liner notes as "Squires") and Andy Couzens except where noted.
 "Getting Plenty" – 4:04
 "Here It Comes" (Brown, Squire) – 2:39
 "Trust a Fox" – 3:03
 "Tradjic Roundabout" – 3:12
 "All I Want" – 3:39
 "Heart on the Staves" – 3:19
 "I Wanna Be Adored" (Brown, Squire) – 3:29
 "This Is the One" (Brown, Squire) – 3:41
 "Fall" – 2:49
 "So Young" (Brown, Squire) – 3:18
 "Tell Me" (Brown, Squire) – 3:52
 "Haddock" – 0:14
 "Just a Little Bit" – 3:08
 "Mission Impossible" – 3:48

References

The Stone Roses albums
1996 compilation albums
Albums produced by Martin Hannett
Self-released albums